Edmond Maître (April 23, 1840  – May 29, 1898) was a French writer, musician, and art collector, best known for his support and association with the Impressionists and his close friendship with Frédéric Bazille and Pierre-Auguste Renoir.  His partner, Rapha Maître, was a model for several works by Renoir.

References 

1840 births
1898 deaths
Impressionism
French art collectors